The Golden Trail Series is a series of international trail races.

Overview
The series plays an important part in the racing schedules of many of the world's best trail runners. Notable male competitors include Stian Angermund, Francesco Puppi, Remi Bonnet, and Frédéric Tranchand, with Maude Mathys and Blandine L'Hirondel among the notable women. Salomon supports the Golden Trail Series.

Competitions and athlete interviews are covered on Golden Trail TV and web series include Chasing Dreams which are presented by running journalist David Hellard.

Races
Races are categorised into the Golden Trail World Series (GTWS), started in 2018, and the Golden Trail National Series (GTNS), started in 2019. The former includes several of the world's most competitive trail races.

The Golden Trail Championship (GTC) was created in 2020 to replace the planned World Series which was cancelled due to the COVID-19 pandemic. It took places in the Azores in the form of a four-day stage race. The success of the GTC format meant that it was proposed as a replacement for the series final in alternating years.

Golden Trail World Series
The Madeira Ocean Trails (Madeira)
Flagstaff Sky Peaks (Flagstaff, Arizona)
Stranda Fjord Trail Race (Stranda)
Zegama-Aizkorri (Zegama)
Pikes Peak Ascent (Pikes Peak)
Sierre-Zinal (Valais)
Marathon du Mont Blanc (Mont Blanc)

Winners
World Series winners since 2018:

2018: Stian Angermund, Ruth Croft
2019: Kilian Jornet, Judith Wyder
2020: Bart Przedwojewski, Maude Mathys
2021: Stian Angermund, Maude Mathys

Golden Trail National Series
Races are predominantly held in Europe, although some races are also held in North America and Asia.

Ergysport Trail du Ventoux
Trail de Guerledan
Mont Blanc Marathon
Skyrhune

Broken Arrow Skyrace
Pikes Peak Ascent
Flagstaff Sky Peaks

Quebec Mega Trail 50k
Whistler Alpine Meadows

Dolomiti Beer Trail
Bettelmatt Sky Race
DoloMyths Run Sky Race
Transpelmo

L'Olla de Núria
Salomon Mitja Pirineu

Louzantrail

Trail Marathon Wales
The Serpent Trail
Scafell Pike Trail Marathon
Ring of Steall

Desafío en las Nubes
Trail de la Mixteca Oaxaqueña
Pachoa Trail

UTVV Slovenia
Kočevsko Outdoor Festival

Risnjak Trail
Učka Trail

Chiemgau Trail Run
Zugspitz Ultratrail Basetrail
Rennsteig-Herbstlauf

Zermatt Marathon
Sierre-Zinal

Pitz Alpine Glacier Trail
Mayrhofen Ultraks

Salomon Ještěd Skyrace, at Ještěd
Salomon Valašský hrb
Salomon Jesenický maraton

Salomon Dragon Trails

Golden Mountains Trails
Tatra SkyMarathon

Hammer Trail

Bodom Trail

Fjällmaraton 27k

Mount Yuzawa Outstanding
Central Alps Skyline Japan
The 4100D Mountain Trail in Nozawa Onsen
Otari Trail Open in Tsugaike
Hakura Classic International

See also
Skyrunner World Series
Vertical Kilometer World Circuit
UTMB World Series

References

External links

 
Trail running competitions
Skyrunning competitions
World cups
Annual athletics series
Ultramarathons